Lucas Favalli (born 16 July 1985) is an Italian Argentine football midfielder.

Career

Early career
Favalli started his career at 3rd division (Interior) side Racing de Córdoba. He later joined Talleres de Córdoba in the Primera Division Argentina in 2002.

Greece
In 2006 Favalli was spotted by scouts from Apollon Kalamarias, and was signed by the club during the summer 2006 transfer window.

From 2006 till 2013 he played for various Greek clubs both in the Greek Super League and the Football League. His last club was Panetolikos of the Football League where he signed a one-year contract.

Return to Argentina
On 21 June 2013, after seven years in Greece, Favalli signed a one-year contract with Argentinian Primera B Nacional club Instituto de Córdoba for an undisclosed fee. In his first season, he completed 36 games and scored 9 goals. As a result of his excellent performance, he signed with Huracán, helping the club to promote to the Argentinian Primera Division after the play-offs.

Return to Greece
On 26 August 2015, Favalli signed a two-year contract with his former club Levadiakos for an undisclosed fee. On 21 January 2016, he signed a six months' contract with Super League rivals AEL Kalloni on loan from Levadiakos. Two days later, he scored on his debut, a 2–0 home win against Panthrakikos.

Honours
Atromitos
Football League: 1 : 2010

References

External links
BDFA profile 
 

Argentine footballers
Argentine expatriate footballers
Association football midfielders
Apollon Pontou FC players
Panetolikos F.C. players
Expatriate footballers in Greece
Talleres de Córdoba footballers
Racing de Córdoba footballers
Levadiakos F.C. players
Super League Greece players
Footballers from Córdoba, Argentina
1985 births
Living people
GAS Ialysos 1948 F.C. players
Argentine expatriate sportspeople in Greece